Olivia "Liv" Boeree (born 18 July 1984) is a British science communicator, television presenter and former professional poker player. She is a World Series of Poker and European Poker Tour champion, and is the only female player in history to win both a WSOP bracelet and an EPT event. Boeree is a 3× winner of the Global Poker Index European Female Player of the year. , having retired in late 2019, Boeree still ranks among the top ten women in poker history in terms of all-time money winnings.

Early life 
Boeree was born in Kent in the South East of England on 18 July 1984 and studied at Ashford School before going on to earn a First Class Honours degree in Physics with Astrophysics at the University of Manchester. During this time she played lead guitar in heavy metal band "Dissonance" and modelled for a number of alternative clothing brands such as Alchemy Gothic.

Poker career
Boeree was introduced to the poker industry when she was selected as one of five contestants for the reality TV show Ultimatepoker.com Showdown, which aired on Five in autumn 2005. During the show she was coached by top poker players Phil Hellmuth, Annie Duke, and Dave Ulliott.

In May 2008, she won the 2008 Ladbrokes European Ladies Championships for $30,000.

On 21 April 2010, Boeree won the European Poker Tour main event in Sanremo, at the time the largest ever poker tournament held on European soil. Boeree won €1,250,000 and thereby became the third woman ever to win an EPT title.

At the 2017 World Series of Poker in Las Vegas, Boeree won event #2 (the "$10,000 Tag Team No-Limit Hold'em Championship") for $273,964 with Russian poker player and boyfriend Igor Kurganov.

Other notable results include a runner-up finish in the 2014 UKIPT Edinburgh Main Event, 1st place on Poker After Dark in 2017 and a 3rd-place finish in the EPT Barcelona High Roller event for €391,000 in August 2015.

Awards: Boeree won Female Player of the Year in 2014, 2015 and 2016 at the European Poker Awards, as determined by Global Poker Index points she accumulated during those years. She was also awarded "Europe's Leading Lady" in 2010 at the European Poker Awards.

Boeree has been a member of Team PokerStars Pro since September 2010. As of January 2020, her total live tournament earnings exceed $3,800,000.

In February 2016, she was announced as the Team Manager of the Global Poker League team "The London Royals".

In November 2019, Liv Boeree announced on Twitter that she had left Team PokerStars after nine years and will quit professional poker.

World Series of Poker bracelets

Charity work
In 2014, Boeree co-founded Raising for Effective Giving, an organization that promotes a rational approach to philanthropy often referred to as effective altruism, and provides advice on choosing charities based on certain criteria. The organization also publishes an annual guide to effective giving, highlighting which charities may be worthy of receiving funds, and for which ethical reasons.

As of July 2020, Raising for Effective Giving has raised over $14,000,000 for its supported charities.

In addition, in 2017 Boeree became a member of Giving What We Can, a community of people who have pledged to give at least 10% of their income to effective charities.

Boeree has raised concerns about possible risks from the development of artificial intelligence and supports research that is directed at safe AI development.

Television and film
Boeree's TV hosting credits include The Weather Channel's "Weird Earth", Discovery Channel's "The Mind Control Freaks" in 2015-2016 and Red Bull TV's "MindGamers" in 2017.

From 2011-2013, she co-hosted UK and Ireland Poker Tour, a weekly show that aired on Channel 4 in the UK.

Her poker TV appearances include NBC's Heads Up Poker in 2011 and 2013, Channel 4's Shark Cage in 2014 and the European Poker Tour from 2010-2016 and Poker After Dark on Poker Central in 2017.

Other appearances include BBC4 Documentary "The Joy of Winning" discussing game theory with Presenter Hannah Fry, BBC Breakfast alongside Boris Becker in September 2010, and on ITV's GMTV by Lorraine Kelly about her European Poker Tour win.

In 2011, Boeree was a member of the Celebrity Graduate Manchester University team that took part in BBC2's seasonal general knowledge tournament, Christmas University Challenge.

In 2006, she appeared on the Channel 4 show Codex.

On 21 July 2007, Boeree appeared on the ITV show Golden Balls, winning £6,500.50.

In 2020, Boeree made an appearance in the Dutch film The Host as Ms. Gueller.

Speaker
Boeree gave her first TEDx talk at TEDxManchester in February 2018 on the benefits of thinking in probabilities. One month later she spoke at the TED 2018 Conference in Vancouver during their inaugural "TED Unplugged" session. Her topic was "3 lessons on decision-making from a poker champion".

Boeree appeared as a guest speaker at Oxford University Union in May 2016, Jesus College, Cambridge in February 2017, the Cheltenham Science Festival in June 2016,
Websummit Dublin in Nov 2015 and Effective Altruism Global, Google HQ in San Francisco Aug 2015

Boeree also appeared on Sean M. Carroll's Mindscape podcast (Episode 6 aired on 24 July 2018) to discuss probability and effective altruism.

Boeree appeared on Lex Fridman's podcast (aired 24 August 2022) to discuss poker, game theory, AI, simulation, aliens & existential risk.

Writing
Boeree has written a number of articles and opinion pieces on various scientific and rationality topics. Her publications include a Vox.com article discussing the philosophical implications of Future of Humanity Institute's 2018 Paper "Dissolving the Fermi Paradox", a Vice Media article on a discovered crystalline pattern in prime numbers and an opinion piece in The Independent on the importance of rational thinking classes in mainstream education. Her June 2020 byline in Nature, reviewing the latest book by Maria Konnikova, lists her as a "science communicator and former professional poker player."

Notes

External links
 
 

1984 births
Living people
Alumni of the University of Manchester
English female models
English poker players
English television presenters
European Poker Tour winners
Female poker players
People associated with effective altruism
People educated at Ashford School
People from Ashford, Kent
World Series of Poker bracelet winners